Highway 324 (AR 324, Ark. 324, and Hwy. 324) is a designation for four state highways in the Arkansas River Valley. One route of  runs from US Highway 64 (US 64) to Tyler Road in Russellville. A second route of  begins at Highway 105 and runs east around Lake Atkins to terminate at Highway 105. A third route of  connects Highway 155 and Highway 10 in Perry County. A fourth segment connects Lake Sylvia Recreational Area in the Ouachita National Forest to Highway 9 and the state highway system. All routes are maintained by the Arkansas State Highway and Transportation Department (AHTD).

Route description

Russellville
Highway 324 connects a Tyson Foods poultry plant and other industrial facilities to the Arkansas state highway system. It serves as a brief connector between the plant near Tyler Road and US 64 in Russellville.

Atkins
The route begins at AR 105 at Gold Hill and loops west around Lake Atkins through Bells Chapel. AR 324 terminates at AR 105 in south Atkins.

Perry County
Highway 324 serves as a connector route between Highway 155 south of Petit Jean State Park and Highway 10 near Adona, a major east-west route in the region.

Lake Sylvia Recreation Area

Highway 324 serves as a connector route to connect Lake Sylvia Recreational Area in the Ouachita National Forest to the state highway system.

History
The Arkansas State Highway Commission created Highway 324 by designating a county road between Atkins and Galla Rock as a state highway on June 23, 1965. The sections in Perry County were added to the state highway system on April 24, 1973. The segment in Russellville was added to the state highway system on January 30, 1986 following a study of north-south traffic flow in the city. The roadway was created to connect the industrial area to the state highway system under a policy to provide connectivity between industrial areas and the state highway system.

Major intersections

See also

 List of state highways in Arkansas

References

External links

324
Transportation in Pope County, Arkansas
Transportation in Perry County, Arkansas